The Tulipeae (syn. Tulipoideae) Duby is a tribe of monocotyledon perennial, herbaceous mainly bulbous flowering plants in the Liliaceae (lily) family. As originally conceived by Duby (1828), "Tulipaceae" was a tribe within Liliaceae, consisting of the genera Tulipa, Fritillaria and Lilium.

Description 

Herbaceous non-climbing bulbous plants. Bulbs consisting of a single scale. Anthers pseudo-basifixed. fruit consists of a loculicidal capsule, seeds not winged. Tetrasporic embryo-sac formation with 7–8 nuclei.  Nucella having a short base. Vesicular-arbuscular mycorrhizae (VAM) non-Clintonia type. Chromosomes large - 2–11 μm (1–6 μm in Gagea). Genome size (3)4–25(70) pg, x = (9)12. Polyploidy common.

Taxonomy 

Tulipeae remained a core group of the Liliaceae, containing the type genus, Lilium for most of its taxonomic history. For instance, Bentham and Hooker (1883), placed Lilium together with Tulipa and five other genera in Liliaceae tribe Tulipeae.

In the modern era, Takhtadzhi︠an described the tribe as having four genera:
 Tulipa
 Amana (considered by some to be included in Tulipa)
 Holongia
 Erythronium

Later only Tulipa and Erythronium were included, and Gagea was added. Tulipeae has been variously constructed, chiefly as either a tribe of the subfamily Lilioideae, or a subfamily of Liliaceae itself (Tulipoideae). However it has been proposed that Gagea should be in its own tribe, the Lloydieae.

The evolutionary and phylogenetic relationships of Tulipeae within Liliaceae are shown in the following Cladogram.

Here, Tulipeae is shown as a clade within the broader construction of Lileae (sensu lato), or as a separate biogeographical tribe if the narrow sense of Lileae (sensu stricto) is adopted, with Lileae and Tulipeae as sister groups. The continuing use of Tulipeae as a separate tribe is supported by several authors.

Genera 

Genera (species)
 Amana Honda (5)
 Erythronium L. (15)
 Gagea Salisb. (=Lloydia Salisb.) (ca. 300)
 Tulipa L. (ca. 150)

Gagea is sister to the other three genera.

Synonyms 

 Gageeae Rouy, Fl. France 12: 380. 1910.
 Lloydieae Buxb., Bot. Arch. 38: 389. 1937.
 Tulipoideae Kostel, Allg. Med.-Pharm. Fl. 1: 168. 1831.

Notes

References

Bibliography 

 
 
 
 
 
 
 
 
 
 
 

Liliaceae
Monocot tribes
Historically recognized angiosperm taxa